Glister may refer to:

Glister (Forgotten Realms), a fictional city in the Forgotten Realms
Glister, a 2008 novel by John Burnside